Aydınlı is a Turkish place name that may refer to the following places in Turkey:

 Aydınlı, Çüngüş
 Aydınlı, Gercüş, a village in the district of Gercüş, Batman Province
 Aydınlı, Vezirköprü, a village in the district of Vezirköprü, Samsun Province